Mario Party is a series of party video games for Nintendo systems.

Legacy
Mario Party may also refer to a specific game:

Nintendo 64
Mario Party (video game) (1998)
Mario Party 2 (1999)
Mario Party 3 (2000)

GameCube
Mario Party 4 (2002)
Mario Party 5 (2003)
Mario Party 6 (2004)
Mario Party 7 (2005)

Wii and Wii U
Mario Party 8 (2007)
Mario Party 9 (2012)
Mario Party 10 (2015)

Handheld systems
Mario Party Advance (2005) for Game Boy Advance
Mario Party DS (2007) for Nintendo DS
Mario Party: Island Tour (2013) for Nintendo 3DS
Mario Party: Star Rush (2016) for Nintendo 3DS
Mario Party: The Top 100 (2017) for Nintendo 3DS

Other systems
Mario Party-e (2003) card-based video game for Nintendo e-Reader
Super Mario Party (2018) for Switch
Mario Party Superstars (2021) for Switch